Cardiosporidium is a genus of parasitic alveolates in the phylum Apicomplexa. It infects the ascidian Ciona intestinalis.

History

This genus was first described by Van Gaver and Stephan in 1907. It was redescribed by Ciancio et al in 2008.

Taxonomy

There is one known species in this genus: Cardiosporidium cionae. It appears to be related to the genera Babesia, Cytauxzoon and Theileria.

Description

The parasite infects the pericardial body of the host. Like other members of this phylum it possesses apicoplasts, rhoptries and subpellicular microtubules.

It is found in the Gulf of Naples and is most common in the months  October to November.

References

Apicomplexa genera